The Uganda Oil Refinery is a planned crude oil refinery in Kabaale village, on the Eastern shore of Lake Albert along the Hoima–Kaiso–Tonya Road, Buseruka Sub-county, Hoima District, Western Region, Uganda, near the international border with the Democratic Republic of the Congo. After 5 years of negotiations the Albertine Graben Refinery Consortium (AGRC)  formed in 2018 and agreed to design and build the refinery.

The refinery will receive crude oil via a heated northern and a heated southern pipeline, for which the Nzizi Power Station, a 100 megawatt thermal power plant, using natural gas and heavy fuel oil as raw material will be built, a hospital and an international airport.

Location

The refinery will be built on a  piece of land in Kabaale village, Buseruka Sub-county, Hoima District, Western Region, near the international border with the Democratic Republic of the Congo, on the eastern shore of Lake Albert. 
The refinery will be located 100 km away from a processing facility, which itself is 100km north-east of Kingfisher oil field, on the Buhuka Flats at the shores of Lake Albert, in the Kikuube District, connected by a 46 km long feeder pipeline, the southern pipeline. The refinery will also be south of the Tilenga project, which will consist of 6 oil fields and 426 oil wells. The northern pipeline would be 96km long with a 16-inch diameter and carry oil from Jobi in Nwoya District, Kasemene, Kigogole and other oilfields in Buliisa District, to the refinery.
Both pipelines will be electrically heated, since the waxy crude oil from Uganda´s oilfields solidifies at room temperature.

Overview

As of 2013, two intake pipelines and one distribution pipeline, with a total construction bill of over US$200 million, were planned to bring crude to the refinery and distribute the finished products to a new terminal in Buloba on the western outskirts of Kampala.

As of 2015 Uganda had proven crude oil reserves of 6.5 billion barrels, about 2.2 billion of which is recoverable. The International Monetary Fund was quoted in 2013 as saying that Ugandas oil reserves are the fourth-largest in sub-Saharan Africa, behind Nigeria, Angola, and South Sudan.

Since some of the largest oil fields are in the Kaiso-Tonya area in Hoima District, the area was selected for Uganda's only oil refinery. The strategy is to build a refinery that meets the petroleum products needs of Uganda and its regional neighbors, with any remaining to be exported.

In addition to the refinery, as of 2015 a new airport and a hospital was planned. The Hoima–Kaiso–Tonya Road, which connects Hoima to Kaiso and Tonya along the eastern shores of Lake Albert, passes through Kabaale Village where the refinery will be located. As of 2016 the Nzizi Power Station was planned, a 100 megawatt thermal power plant, using natural gas and heavy fuel oil as raw material. 

In 2015, the cost of the refinery was estimated to be US$4.3 billion, with 70 percent of that amount to be borrowed and the remaining 30 percent coming from shareholders.
In July 2015, the government hired the Danish Ramboll Group A/S to conduct an "'early phase' detailed route and environmental study for an oil pipeline that will run from the Albertine Graben - Hoima to Buloba...."

History

The government of Uganda has, from the beginning, preferred a small production capacity to prolong the longevity of its new oil discoveries. This preference initially pitted it against the three major exploration companies in the country, which preferred rapid harvesting and export of the crude via pipeline to the Kenyan coast.

In March 2013, the government of Uganda engaged the US-based energy investment and consulting firm Taylor Dejongh to carry out an international search for a strategic investor in the refinery. 

In October 2013, the government of Uganda invited interested parties to bid for the construction, operation, and 60 percent ownership of the refinery in a public-private partnership arrangement.

In January 2014, the Ugandan government shortlisted the following six consortia out of fifteen applicants for possible selection as strategic investor in the refinery: China Petroleum Pipeline Bureau ( People's Republic of China), Marubeni Corporation (Japan), Petrofac (United Arab Emirates), RT Global Resources (Russia), SK Energy (South Korea), and Vitol (the Netherlands).

In June 2014, media reports indicated that four of the six companies had submitted detailed proposals for the construction of the refinery. At that time, the firms still left in the bidding were China Petroleum Pipeline Bureau, Marubeni Corporation, RT Global Resources, and SK Energy.

In June 2014, it was reported that consortia led by RT Global Resources and SK Energy had emerged as the two best contenders. They were requested to make a last and final proposal so that the winner could be selected by the end of August 2014.

In February 2015, media reports indicated that the consortium led by RT Global Resources (also including Telconet Capital Limited Partnership, VTB Capital, JSC Tatneft, and the GS Engineering and Construction Corporation) had won the bid to build the refinery.

According to a July 2016 report, talks between the government of Uganda and RT Global Resources which had started in February 2015 broke down, and the consortium pulled out. Uganda then began negotiations with the reserve bidder, the consortium led by SK Engineering & Construction of South Korea. The new consortium members included SK Engineering and Construction, the KBD Global Investment Partnership Private Equity Fund, the China State Construction Engineering Corporation, Haldor Topsøe A/S, and Maestro Oil and Gas.

In late 2016, negotiations with the consortium led by SK Engineering & Construction also broke down. Negotiations were then started with a new consortium led by Guangzhou Dongsong Energy Group, a Chinese company. Others in that consortium included (a) China Petroleum Engineering & Construction Corporation (CPECC) (b) China Africa Fund for Industrial Cooperation (CAFIC) (c) Guangzhou Silk Road (d) East China Design and Engineering Institute (e) Exim Bank of China and (f) Industrial and Commercial Bank of China (ICBC). Those talks collapsed in June 2017 when CPECC, the main contractor in the consortium, pulled out of the talks.

In August 2017, a new consortium led by General Electric of the United States and Jk Minerals Africa of South Africa agreed to build the US$4 Billion refinery and to own 50 and 10 percent respectively, while the government of Uganda and other investors would take up the remaining 40 percent. Other members in this new consortium were (i) Yaatra Ventures LLC, (ii) Intracontinent Asset Holdings and (iii) Saipem SpA of Italy. These firms were competitors during the initial bidding, but they came together and formed a special purpose vehicle, the Albertine Graben Refinery Consortium (AGRC),  to design, procure the necessary supplies and build the refinery.

Ownership
In 2015, General Electric was expected to take up 50 percent and Jk Minerals Africa 10 percent. The government of Uganda proposed that the remaining 40 percent be divided among itself, Burundi, Kenya, Rwanda, and Tanzania in equal shares, except that Uganda would assume whatever ownership interests are not subscribed by the other countries. Kenya agreed to purchase a 2.5 percent interest in the refinery for an estimated KES:5.6 billion. As of 2016, it had not decided whether to increase that interest to the maximum of 8 percent, saying that it needed to further evaluate the project's commercial value in light of the government's budgetary constraints.

In 2014 Burundi and Rwanda submitted letters of interest to Uganda. Burundi did not decided the extent of its ownership interest, waiting on the feasibility study of the refinery and a detailed statement of anticipated costs.

In 2016, Tanzania committed to pay US$150.4 million for 8 percent ownership in the refinery.

In October 2016, it was reported that TotalEnergies of France had committed to acquiring 10 percent shareholding in the refinery.

As of April 2018 the tentative ownership table was as follows:

Agreement
In April 2018, the Albertine Graben Refinery Consortium signed a definitive agreement with the government of Uganda, committing to design, develop,  finance, construct, operate and maintain the planned 60,000-barrel-per-day Uganda Oil Refinery in Hoima District, in the Western Region of Uganda The signing of this Project Framework Agreement, allows for the commencement of the Front End Engineering and Design, Project Capital and Investment Costs Estimation (PCE) and environmental impact assessment and social impact assessments.

In August 2018, the Albertine Graben Refinery Consortium (AGRC), selected Saipem SpA of Italy and a member of AGRC to begin with the FEED study, at a contract price of US$68 million. The study is expected to last 17 months, to be followed by the engineering, procurement, and construction phase.

In March 2022, following meetings with AGRC principals in Italy, Ruth Nankabirwa, the Ugandan oil minister at that time, estimated that FID for the refinery might be reached in 2023 and commercial operations could be expected in 2027.

See also

 East African Crude Oil Pipeline (EACOP)
 Hoima–Kampala Petroleum Products Pipeline
 Petroleum Authority of Uganda
 Kenya–Uganda–Rwanda Petroleum Products Pipeline
 Uganda National Oil Company
 Uganda–Kenya Crude Oil Pipeline

References

External links
 How Uganda refinery will impact the region As at 16 April 2019. 
 Uganda Sets Up Region’s First Oil Laboratory
 The Uganda refinery: Satisfying region’s demand for petroleum As of 17 October 2018.

Oil refineries in Uganda
Hoima District
Western Region, Uganda
Proposed energy infrastructure in Africa
Petroleum infrastructure in Uganda